The Sulawesi black sailfin lizard (Hydrosaurus celebensis) is a species of agamid native to Indonesia.
It is the second largest species of sailfin dragon, with only the Sulawesi giant sailfin dragon being larger., exceeding 1000 mm in total length, possibly 1200 mm. Head, neck, gular region and shoulder completely black; a row of enlarged flat, sometimes conical scales on either side of the neck; nuchal and dorsal crests continuous; a group of dirty white enlarged flat scales on the anterior part of the dorsum; few (<10) additional enlarged scales approximately at midbody and before the hindlimbs. Dorsal colouration is typically yellowish, sometimes dark orange, interspersed with black spots; ventrally beige, limbs black with a few yellow spots; scales under fourth and fifth toes are broad with several keels from near the base of the toe; tail black, sail black or dark violet with black stripes.

Reproduction
H. celebensis is oviparous.

References

celebensis
Reptiles described in 1872
Taxa named by Wilhelm Peters